Philly's Most Wanted was an American hip hop duo composed of Al "Boo-Bonic" Holly and Joel "Mr. Man" Witherspoon. The duo broke into the music business as affiliates of production duo, The Neptunes.

The duo signed with Atlantic Records in 2000 and issued their first two singles, "Y'all Can't Never Hurt Us" and "Cross the Border" soon after. The latter song peaked at #98 on the Billboard Hot 100 and 3 on the Billboard Hot Rap Singles. Their debut album, Get Down or Lay Down, however, was delayed for over a year, finally being released on August 7, 2001. Despite production from The Neptunes, the album failed commercially, only reaching No. 69 on the Billboard 200 majorly due to the fact that BET refused to support their video for Cross the Border which contributed to the end of the duo as well.

After both The Neptunes and Atlantic Records severed ties with them, the duo shortened their name to Philly's Most and released a second album entitled Ring the Alarm in 2004 before disbanding shortly after.

Discography

Albums

Singles

References 

Atlantic Records artists
Hip hop groups from Philadelphia
Musical groups established in 2000
Musical groups disestablished in 2004
Universal Records artists
American musical duos
Hip hop duos